Zhan Wen-ting  (born August 27, 1981), known professionally as Faye, is a Taiwanese singer and businesswoman. She is the former lead vocalist of pop rock band F.I.R., who won Golden Melody Award for Best New Artist in 2005. 

In 2017, Faye made her solo debut with the album Little Outerspace. In 2021, Faye released her second album Zai Yun Cai Shang Tiao Wu Ji Ji Zha Zha.

Personal life 
Faye was born in Taipei, Taiwan. Her father was once the general manager of Taisun Enterprise, a Taiwanese food and beverage company.

She attended Taipei Tsai Hsing Private School and graduated from Fu Jen Catholic University in 2003, where she majored in English literature and was a member of indie group "Yu Hun Band".

In 2009, Faye co-founded Lilla Fé, a scented product company that sells cosmetics, skin care and perfume products.

Discography

Studio albums

Singles

Filmography

Television series

Theater

Awards and nominations

References

External links 

 
 
 

1981 births
21st-century businesswomen
21st-century Taiwanese actresses
21st-century Taiwanese businesspeople
21st-century Taiwanese singers
21st-century Taiwanese women singers
Businesspeople from Taipei
Fu Jen Catholic University alumni
Living people
Musicians from Taipei
Taiwanese women company founders